Paris is the debut album by the power trio Paris, which was active from 1975 to 1977. It was the only album recorded by the original Paris line up, as drummer Thom Mooney left shortly afterwards.

The songs on Paris were all written by guitarist/vocalist Bob Welch and are in a vein similar to Led Zeppelin. The album reached number 103 on the Billboard pop album chart.

In 2013, Capitol Records/USM Japan/Universal Music remastered and reissued a paper-sleeve album replica (Mini LP) SHM-CD version of Paris (TYCP-80036).

Re-release
The album was re-released on CD, on the Zoom Club label, in 2000 and again in 2004. The CD re-release did not include any additional, re-mixed or other bonus tracks.
The album was reissued on CD by Rock Candy Records in 2012

Cover art
The logo of the band was Cornick's creation.

Track listing

Personnel
Paris
Bob Welch - vocals, guitar
Glenn Cornick - bass guitar, keyboards
Thom Mooney - drums

Additional personnel
 Jimmy Robinson - production, engineering
 Roy Kohara - art direction

References

External links
 Paris (album) at Discogs.

1976 debut albums
Capitol Records albums